Bear Brook State Park is a  preserve in Allenstown, New Hampshire, and neighboring towns. It is one of New Hampshire's largest state parks.

The park is home to the New Hampshire Snowmobile Museum, Old Allenstown Meeting House, and the Richard Diehl Civilian Conservation Corps (CCC) Museum, which are in historic buildings built by the Civilian Conservation Corps.

The park takes its name from Bear Brook, a stream which runs through the park. Its environment is that of the Northeastern coastal forests ecoregion.

In 1985 and 2000, the remains of four females were found in the park. In January 2017, a suspect in the case was identified as Terry Peder Rasmussen (also known by several aliases) who had died in prison in 2010. In June 2019, three of the females were identified.

See also

Allenstown Meeting House
Bear Brook State Park Civilian Conservation Corps (CCC) Camp Historic District

References

External links 

Bear Brook State Park New Hampshire Department of Natural and Cultural Resources
New Hampshire Snowmobile Museum

State parks of New Hampshire
Parks in Merrimack County, New Hampshire
Museums in Merrimack County, New Hampshire
Nature centers in New Hampshire
Civilian Conservation Corps in New Hampshire
Civilian Conservation Corps museums
Transportation museums in New Hampshire
Buildings and structures in Merrimack County, New Hampshire
Allenstown, New Hampshire